Mitchell Curry (born 14 July 1999) is an English professional footballer who plays as a striker.

Career
Curry joined Middlesbrough at under-15 level, signing professional terms in 2016.

On 23 September 2017, Curry joined Harrogate Town on loan for an initial month. The loan was extended for a second month, and he made seven appearances in league and FA Cup and scored once, a late winner away to Curzon Ashton that took Harrogate top of the National League North.

He moved on loan to Scottish Championship side Inverness Caledonian Thistle on 26 June 2019, with the loan having a recall option for January 2020. Curry returned to Middlesbrough on 7 January 2020, having made 15 appearances in which he scored 2 goals. 

Curry joined Gateshead on loan for the remainder of the season just three days later.

He left Middlesbrough at the end of the 2019–20 season.

In September 2020 he signed for Sunderland. He made his Sunderland debut on 15 December 2020 in a 1–1 draw with AFC Wimbledon.

In April 2021, Curry joined USL League One side Fort Lauderdale CF ahead of the 2021 season.

On 27 January 2022, it was announced that Curry had signed with USL Championship side Hartford Athletic.

Career statistics

References

1999 births
Living people
English footballers
Association football forwards
Middlesbrough F.C. players
Harrogate Town A.F.C. players
Inverness Caledonian Thistle F.C. players
Gateshead F.C. players
Sunderland A.F.C. players
Inter Miami CF II players
Hartford Athletic players
Scottish Professional Football League players
English Football League players
National League (English football) players
English expatriate footballers
English expatriates in the United States
Expatriate soccer players in the United States
USL League One players